Dame Catherine Mary Hall  (19 December 1922 – 26 August 1996) was a British nurse and nursing administrator who was a long serving General Secretary of the UK's Royal College of Nursing (1957–82).

Early life and education 
Hall was born on 19 December 1922 in Sheffield, England. Her father was the chief constable in Rotherham, which is where she moved when she was still a child. Hall went to school at Hunmanby School for Girls at Filey, Yorkshire and then went on to study nursing at Leeds General Hospital.

Career and achievements 
Hall knew from the age of 14 that she wanted to be a nurse, but her parents were against this. It was after World War II broke out that she began her career at Birmingham Children's Hospital where she started her pre-training. After this she became ward sister at Leeds General Infirmary where she was the youngest person to fill that role at age 22, later rising to Night Superintendent and Assistant Matron by age 28. Hall spent some time in Canada and the United States (1951–52) on a travelling fellowship.

Hall made the move from Birmingham to Leeds where she completed her training to be closer to home as her mother had become ill. In 1954 Hall was then appointed to the position of Assistant Matron at Middlesex Hospital following a year of study with the Royal College of Nursing. The Royal College of Nursing had to advertise twice before appointing Hall as its general secretary, replacing Frances Goodall at the age of 34.

It was during Hall's time as general secretary, and under her leadership, that the Royal College of Nursing became a trade union in 1977 which she felt was an 'essential step'. Although Hall was opposed to industrial action, she publicly criticised the governments proposed 2.5% salary hike for nurses. After a confrontation with Enoch Powell, Conservative MP and Minister of Health, Hall negotiated a 7.5% increase. Another achievement during Hall's time as general secretary was her support of the campaign to allow men to join the RCN and the registers were opened to them in 1960 with the lifting of the constitutional ban. The first male nurse on the College's registers was Albery Verdun Whittamore who was chief male nurse at Horton Psychiatric Hospital. It was also during her time as general secretary that Hall opened the nursing registers to enrolled nurses in 1969 and then a year later to student nurses. Hall's contribution to the RCN was to increase the membership from 30,000 to 200,000.

Hall served on many committees:
 Assistant Matron, Middlesex Hospital, London (1954–56).
 General Secretary, Royal College of Nursing (1957–82).
 Member, Commission on Industrial Relations (1971–74).
 Member, General Medical Council (1979–89).
 First chairwoman on UK Central Council for Nursing, Midwifery and Health Visiting (1980–85).
 Sat on the panel for the World Health Organization.

Awards
 Commander of the Order of the British Empire (CBE), 1967 New Year Honours.
 Honours, 1975 – From City University in 'recognition of her outstanding services in maintaining and developing the science, art, status, standards, practice and general recognition of the nursing profession'.
 She was made a Fellow of the Royal College of Nursing in 1976.
 Officer Sister of the Order of St John of Jerusalem (1977).
 Dame Commander of the Order of the British Empire (DBE), 1982 New Year Honours.

References

1922 births
1996 deaths
People from Rotherham
People from Sheffield
English nurses
British nursing administrators
Dames Commander of the Order of the British Empire
Place of death missing
Fellows of the Royal College of Nursing
Officers of the Order of St John
British nurses